Stephen Kenny is an Australian lawyer. He acted as the original lawyer for David Hicks, a Guantánamo Bay detainee.

Kenny has practiced as a barrister and solicitor in Australia for over 25 years. He has maintained a strong interest in civil liberties and is the past Chairperson of the South Australian Council for Civil Liberties. Throughout his career, Kenny has acted for indigenous people, including on personal and Native Title Land Claim matters as well as undertaking pro-bono work for migrant families and community groups.

In the 1990s he acted for the Ngarrindjeri during the Hindmarsh Island bridge controversy.

In January 2002 after reading press reports of the detention of David Hicks at Guantánamo Bay, Kenny offered his services to his Adelaide family. With permission of the family, Kenny commenced legal proceedings in the United States for a Writ of Habeas Corpus against President Bush and the US Military who were detaining Hicks. Known as Rasul v. Bush, the legal proceedings resulted in the United States Supreme Court ruling that Guantánamo Bay was within the jurisdiction of the US Courts. This led to a number of other detainees taking action against their detention in US Federal Courts.

Awards
Kenny has won the 2010 Law Society of South Australia's justice award.

References

External links
 David Hicks' lawyer reveals why he sued the US and Australian governments

Living people
20th-century Australian lawyers
Guantanamo Bay attorneys
Year of birth missing (living people)
People educated at Sacred Heart College, Adelaide
21st-century Australian lawyers